She Cried Murder is a 1973 American TV film starring Telly Savalas and Linda Day George.

Plot
A model witnesses a murder, and the cop investigating is the one who did it.  And he knows she knows, and she knows he knows she knows.

Cast
Telly Savalas as Inspector Joe Brody
Lynda Day George as Sarah Cornell
Mike Farrell as Detective Walter Stepanic
Kate Reid as Maggie Knowlton
Len Birman as Marvin
Jeff Toner as Chris Cornell
Murray Westgate as Sergeant Withers
Robert Goodier as Chief McKenzie
Richard Alden as 2nd Policeman
Aileen Seaton as Sister Maria Theresa
B. Hope Garber as Mrs. Brody
Stu Gillard as TV Director

References

External links
She Cried Murder at TCMDB
She Cried Murder at IMDb

1973 films
1973 television films
Action television films
CBS network films
Films shot in Toronto
American thriller television films
1970s English-language films
Films directed by Herschel Daugherty
1970s American films